The 2014 Adur District Council elections took place on 22 May 2014 to elect members of Adur District Council in West Sussex, England. Half of the council was up for election.

Results

By ward

References

2014
2014 English local elections
2010s in West Sussex